Sarah Thompson, Countess Rumford, (18 October 1774 – 2 December 1852) was a philanthropist. She is the first American to be known as a Countess.

Early life

Both her parents were born and brought up in the American colonies and married there in 1772.

During the American Revolutionary War of 1775 to 1783, Benjamin Thompson took the side of the British, and at the end of the war he moved to London. He was knighted in 1784.

Adult life

Later life

Bibliography

 Metcalf, Henry Harrison et al.,  The Granite Monthly, published 1886, Original from the University of California, Google Books digitized.

References

External links
 A Biography of Benjamin Thompson (her father), written in 1868
 Count Rumford – General Benjamin Thompson additional family history

1774 births
1852 deaths
German countesses
People from Concord, New Hampshire
People of New Hampshire in the American Revolution
Counts of the Holy Roman Empire